Christof Unterberger (born October 28, 1970) is an Austrian cellist and film composer.

Biography
Unterberger was born in Bregenz, Austria. He received his first cello training at the Conservatory of Graz and later at the Higher School of Music in Graz with Prof. H. Posch and Prof. R. Leopold. Following that he took his master's courses under Phillipe Muller und Paul Tortelier. From 1991-1995 he studied at the "Conservatoire national superieur de musique" in Paris with Klaus Heitz, and then again with Phillipe Muller, under whose teaching he completed his concert diploma.

He was a soloist and in chamber orchestras both in Austria and abroad. He has played Beethoven's Triple Concerto under the direction of Fabio Luisi and has also performed concerts by Haydn, Vivaldi, Georg Matthias Monn (arr. Schoenberg), Saint-Saëns and Tchaikovsky. Christof Unterberger is solo cellist with the Viennese Chamber Philharmonic, with the Viennese Schubert Ensemble, with the Viennese Chamber Opera and with the Ensemble Reconsil Vienna. 

Recently, Christof Unterberger has been working with styles of music outside the realm of classical music. Appearances with Soap&Skin, Kenny Werner, Arkardy Shilkloper, Ulrich Drechsler, Etta Scollo, Patricia Kaas, Michael Bolton, Sarah Brightman, Natalie Cole, Marque and Nneka have led him into the world of jazz, soul and pop.
Christof Unterberger started composing in 2006 and is self-taught in composition and orchestration.
A collaboration with Hollywood-based composer Jeff Rona led him into the world of film and media music.

Christof Unterberger has published several remixes under his alias  at Peter Gabriels Realworld Remixed project/competition.
In June 2007 he received the second prize for his remix of the song "Salala" by Angelique Kidjo featuring Peter Gabriel.

He is self-taught in composition, arranging, and orchestration.

Filmography
 Stabat (2005)
 I Love In You (2007)
 Terror am Flughafen (2010)
 Un nuovo Regno (2011)
 Sturm der Liebe (2013-2015)
 Delete Lovers (2014)
 Iceman 3D (2014)
 Universum History Maximilian von Mexico (2014)
 Die Ringstraße - Trilogie eines Boulevards (2015)
 Universum-Lost City Of Gladiators (2015)
 The Ark (2021)
 Die Rothschild-Saga: Aufstieg - Glanz - Verfolgung (2021)
 Condor's Nest (2022)

Awards
 Moondance Columbine Award 2006 at the Moondance International Film Festival in Hollywood
 Best film score at the Dervio Film Festival in Italy.
 2nd prize at Realworldremixed competition 2007
 Vienna Film Music Award, second prize 2009
 Honorary Prize of University of Music and Performing arts  Vienna 2010
 Vienna Film Music Award, first prize 2010

External links
http://www.thefilmscore.com The official website of Christof Unterberger
http://www.imdb.com/name/nm2345065/?ref_=rvi_nm IMDB page

1970 births
Living people
People from Bregenz
Austrian classical cellists
Austrian male composers
Austrian composers